Experimental Design Diagram (EDD) is a diagram used in science classrooms to design an experiment. This diagram helps to identify the essential components of an experiment. It includes a title, the research hypothesis and null hypothesis, the independent variable, the levels of the independent variable, the number of trials, the dependent variable, the operational definition of the dependent variable and the constants.

References

Design of experiments